Willie Ross School for the Deaf is a school for the deaf and hard-of-hearing located in Longmeadow, Massachusetts.  The school was founded in 1967.

External links
School website

Schools for the deaf in Massachusetts
Schools in Hampden County, Massachusetts
Private schools in Massachusetts